Richard Northcroft "Dick" Whitaker (born 15 July 1947) is an Australian meteorologist and author. Whitaker is also the Chief Meteorologist on The Weather Channel, following his esteemed thirty-year career as a meteorologist with the Bureau of Meteorology.

Bureau of Meteorology
Whitaker began working with the Bureau of Meteorology in 1971, aged twenty-four. A decade later, he was promoted to the role of Officer in Charge of the Facilities and Information section of the Bureau. He held this position for three years, before being promoted again to Senior Operational Forecaster in the Sydney bureau, Australia's largest.

In 1984, he was presented with an Australia Day Achievement Award for his work in the field of meteorology. In 1992, Whitaker became the New South Wales Manager for Special Services, dealing with exceptional circumstances and disaster recovery operations. He retired from the Bureau in 2002 after thirty-one years.

During the final years of his tenure at the Bureau, between 1999 and 2001 Whitaker worked with the World Meteorological Organisation as a rapporteur for the Committee of Agricultural Meteorology.

Research and developments
Whitaker is partly credited with the initial development of precipitation charts for the Australian mass media. Such charts are now used throughout the print and electronic media to convey data about present and future rainfall in graphical form.

In his second year at the Bureau of Meteorology, 1972, he developed and authored a manual for aviation forecasting in the state of New South Wales, still used today. Whitaker also researched the correlation between sea surface temperatures in the Indian Ocean and rainfall in Australia, which is now used as a routine consideration in the production of seasonal rainfall outlooks.

Publications and media
Whitaker is now the chief meteorologist on The Weather Channel, having joined the station in 2004. On air, his first name is abbreviated to "Dick". He also presents numerous radio weather crosses to a selection of stations around Australia on a daily basis. Whitaker has authored or co-authored several books about weather and historical topics, having a particular interest in Natural Disasters.

List of publications

9781877069437

Whitaker, Richard (2021). Weather, Waves & Water, The New South Wales Central Coast. Sydney, Australia: Weathersmart Publishing. ISBN 9780648883609.

References

Living people
1947 births
Australian meteorologists
Meteorologists from Melbourne
Australian non-fiction writers
Australian television personalities
Australian radio personalities